Black Litter or Black Brood is a 1977 Spanish drama film directed by Manuel Gutiérrez Aragón. In June 1977, it was entered into the 27th Berlin International Film Festival, where Aragón won the Silver Bear for Best Director. The film makes a portrait of extreme right groups in post-Francoist Spain. A central figure in the story is Blanca, matriarchal figure and fascist leader alike.

Cast

References

External links

1977 films
1970s Spanish-language films
1977 drama films
Films directed by Manuel Gutiérrez Aragón
Spanish drama films
Films about fascists
Films set in the 1970s
Films set in Spain
1970s Spanish films
Films about the Spanish Transition